Ashley Hudson is a state representative in Arkansas. She was elected to the Arkansas House of Representatives in 2020 and represents part of Pulaski County, Arkansas.

References

Year of birth missing (living people)
Living people
Arkansas lawyers
University of Arkansas School of Law alumni
People from Pulaski County, Arkansas
Democratic Party members of the Arkansas House of Representatives
Vanderbilt University alumni
21st-century American women lawyers
21st-century American lawyers
21st-century American women politicians
21st-century American politicians